Abim General Hospital, also known as Abim Hospital, is a government-owned hospital in the Northern Region of Uganda. It is the district hospital for the Abim District.

Location
The coordinates of the hospital are 02°41'56.0"N, 33°39'28.0"E (Latitude:2.698892; Longitude:33.657788).

Overview
The hospital was built in 1969 during the first administration of Milton Obote (1962 to 1971). Since its founding, the hospital infrastructure has deteriorated, the equipment has aged or ceased working, and the poorly paid staff have become demoralized.

Renovations and improvements
In February 2016, the hospital underwent renovations, including rehabilitation of its water supply system. The authorities plan to hire four additional physicians for the facility and to re-equip it with beds and bedding.

See also
List of hospitals in Uganda
Health in Uganda

References

External links
 Website of Uganda Ministry of Health
 BBC journalists arrested for filming Abim Hospital

Hospitals in Uganda
Abim District
Karamoja
Northern Region, Uganda